Smrek is a Slovak language surname.  Notable people with the surname include:

Mike Smrek (born 1962), Canadian basketball player who played in the National Basketball Association
Peter Smrek (born 1979), Slovak ice hockey player
Stanislav Smrek (born 1986), Slovak footballer

See also
 
Smerek (surname)

Slovak-language surnames